Sir Vaughan Frederick Randal Jones   (31 December 19526 September 2020) was a New Zealand mathematician known for his work on von Neumann algebras and knot polynomials. He was awarded a Fields Medal in 1990.

Early life
Jones was born in Gisborne, New Zealand, on 31 December 1952.  He was brought up in Cambridge, New Zealand, where he attended St Peter's School.  He subsequently transferred to Auckland Grammar School after winning the Gillies Scholarship, and graduated in 1969 from Auckland Grammar.  He went on to complete his undergraduate studies at the University of Auckland, obtaining a BSc in 1972 and an MSc in 1973.  For his graduate studies, he went to Switzerland, where he completed his PhD at the University of Geneva in 1979.  His thesis, titled Actions of finite groups on the hyperfinite II1 factor, was written under the supervision of André Haefliger, and won him the Vacheron Constantin Prize.

Career
Jones moved to the United States in 1980.  There, he taught at the University of California, Los Angeles (1980–1981), and the University of Pennsylvania (1981–1985), before being appointed as professor of mathematics at the University of California, Berkeley.  His work on knot polynomials, with the discovery of what is now called the Jones polynomial, was from an unexpected direction with origins in the theory of von Neumann algebras, an area of analysis already much developed by Alain Connes.  It led to the solution of a number of classical problems of knot theory, to increased interest in low-dimensional topology, and the development of quantum topology.

Jones taught at Vanderbilt University as Stevenson Distinguished Professor of mathematics from 2011 until his death.  He remained Professor Emeritus at University of California, Berkeley, where he had been on the faculty from 1985 to 2011 and was a Distinguished Alumni Professor at the University of Auckland.

Jones was made an honorary vice-president for life of the International Guild of Knot Tyers in 1992.  The Jones Medal, created by the Royal Society of New Zealand in 2010, is named after him.

Personal life
Jones met his wife, Martha Myers, during a ski camp for foreign students while they were studying in Switzerland.  She was there as a Fulbright scholar, and subsequently became an associate professor of medicine, health and society.  Together, they have three children.

Jones died on 6 September 2020 at age 67 from health complications resulting from a severe ear infection.

Jones was a certified barista.

Honours and awards
 1990awarded the Fields Medal
 1990elected Fellow of the Royal Society
 1991awarded the Rutherford Medal by the Royal Society of New Zealand
 1991awarded the degree of Doctor of Science by the University of Auckland
 1992elected to the Australian Academy of Science as a Corresponding Fellow
 1992awarded a Miller Professorship at the University of California Berkeley
 2002appointed Distinguished Companion of the New Zealand Order of Merit (DCNZM) in the 2002 Queen's Birthday and Golden Jubilee Honours, for services to mathematics
 2009his DCNZM redesignated to a Knight Companion of the New Zealand Order of Merit in the 2009 Special Honours
 2012elected a Fellow of the American Mathematical Society

Publications

See also 
 Aharonov–Jones–Landau algorithm
 Planar algebra
 Subfactor

References

External links 

 
 
 Jones' home page
 Career profile page at the University of Auckland
 Joan S. Birman: The Work of Vaughan F. R. Jones in Ichirō Satake (ed.): Proceedings of the International Congress of Mathematicians, 21–29 August 1990, Kyoto, Japan, Springer, 1991 (Laudatio for Fields-Medal 1990; online)

1952 births
2020 deaths
People from Gisborne, New Zealand
People from Waikato
People educated at Auckland Grammar School
University of Auckland alumni
Fields Medalists
20th-century New Zealand mathematicians
21st-century New Zealand mathematicians
New Zealand expatriates in Switzerland
University of Geneva alumni
University of California, Los Angeles faculty
University of Pennsylvania faculty
University of California, Berkeley College of Letters and Science faculty
Vanderbilt University faculty
Knights Companion of the New Zealand Order of Merit
Fellows of the American Mathematical Society
Fellows of the Royal Society of New Zealand
New Zealand Fellows of the Royal Society
Members of the United States National Academy of Sciences
Recipients of the Rutherford Medal
Fellows of the Australian Academy of Science